The 2017 Challenger Ciudad de Guayaquil was a professional tennis tournament played on clay courts. It was the thirteenth edition of the tournament which was part of the 2017 ATP Challenger Tour. It took place in Guayaquil, Ecuador between October 30 and November 4, 2017.

Singles main-draw entrants

Seeds

 1 Rankings are as of 23 October 2017.

Other entrants
The following players received wildcards into the singles main draw:
  Emilio Gómez
  José Hernández-Fernández
  Roberto Quiroz
  Juan Pablo Varillas

The following players received entry as alternates:
  Hugo Dellien
  João Souza

The following players received entry from the qualifying draw:
  Martín Cuevas
  Juan Pablo Ficovich
  Dimitar Kuzmanov
  Gonzalo Lama

Champions

Singles

 Gerald Melzer def.  Facundo Bagnis 6–3, 6–1.

Doubles

 Marcelo Arévalo /  Miguel Ángel Reyes-Varela def.  Hugo Dellien /  Federico Zeballos 6–1, 6–7(7–9), [10–6].

External links
Official Website

Challenger Ciudad de Guayaquil
2017
Tennis tournaments in Ecuador